Hamlet Mkhitaryan (14 September 1962 – 6 May 1996) was a Soviet and Armenian football player who played as a striker for the Armenia national football team and played most of his club career for Armenian Premier League club Ararat Yerevan and CFA 2 club ASOA Valence.

Mkhitaryan was one of the best players of the Soviet Top League during the 1980s, scoring 46 goals for the club, and played for ASOA Valence during the peak of the team in Ligue 2. He is the father of Henrikh Mkhitaryan, a current Armenian international footballer who plays for Italian club Inter Milan.

Club career
Hamlet Mkhitaryan started playing for Ararat Yerevan in 1980. At this time, the club had few players who had played for it back in the 1970s, when the team has achieved a number of successes, including winning the 1973 Soviet Top League. Thus, the 1980s were a new era for Ararat Yerevan. Mkhitaryan was a team regular and one of the leaders of the club's attack. In the 1984 Soviet Top League, Mkhitaryan scored 18 goals. The only player who scored more than him was Sergey Andreyev, who scored 19 goals. Editors of the magazine Soviet Warrior awarded Mkhitaryan their newly established prize, Knight of Attack. This award was presented to the football player who had scored most often (per season) three or more goals in a single league match. Mkhitaryan made three hat-tricks and one poker in the 1984 Top League.

In 1988, he moved to Kotayk Abovyan, where he spent half of the season. In July 1989, he went to France, where he later played for ASOA Valence, a club founded by French Armenians. Mkhitaryan is considered one of the first official foreign players from Armenia who went to play in the western, non-Soviet affiliated world (and not emigrated). Abraham Hayrapetyan, who lived in France and was mainly working on arranging tours of Soviet players to Europe, helped him to move to Valence. After Mkhitaryan came to the club, he helped Valence go up from the Championnat National third division to the Ligue 2 second division. Mkhitaryan later joined ASA Issy, another club formed by Armenians in France, which he played on for only six months. He could not continue his career as a football player because of a brain tumor. Knowing he was dying, Hamlet went back to Yerevan, wanting to die at home. After three operations performed within one year, his life could not be saved and he died at the age of 33 on 6 May 1996.

International career
Mkhitaryan debuted for the Armenia national football team on 7 September 1994 in a UEFA Euro 1996 qualifying match against Belgium at the Constant Vanden Stock Stadium in Brussels, which Armenia lost 0–2. He played his last game next in another UEFA Euro 1996 qualifier against Cyprus on 8 October 1994 at the Hrazdan Stadium in Yerevan. The match ended 0–0.

Personal life
Hamlet was married to Marina Taschyan. They had two children, a daughter named Monica and a son named Henrikh, who is currently a professional footballer for Inter Milan and the Armenia national team. The Mkhitaryans lived in the Kentron district of Yerevan. His wife was the head of the national teams department in the Armenian Football Federation and their daughter works at the UEFA headquarters. His son followed in his footsteps and became a football player, currently being the captain of the Armenia national football team. Those who saw both Hamlet and Henrikh play say that their styles resemble each other very much.

References

External links
 Career summary by KLISF
 
 Armfootball.tripod.com
 
 

1962 births
1996 deaths
Deaths from brain tumor
Deaths from cancer in Armenia
Footballers from Yerevan
Association football forwards
Soviet footballers
Soviet expatriate footballers
Armenian footballers
Armenian expatriate footballers
Expatriate footballers in France
Soviet expatriate sportspeople in France
Armenian expatriate sportspeople in France
Soviet Armenians
Soviet Top League players
Ligue 2 players
Armenia international footballers
FC Ararat Yerevan players
ASOA Valence players
ASA Issy players